The 1987 Tennessee Volunteers football team (variously "Tennessee", "UT" or the "Vols") represented the University of Tennessee in the 1987 NCAA Division I-A football season. Playing as a member of the Southeastern Conference (SEC), the team was led by head coach Johnny Majors, in his 11th year, and played their home games at Neyland Stadium in Knoxville, Tennessee. They finished the season with a record of ten wins, two losses and one tie (10–2–1 overall, 4–1–1 in the SEC) and with a victory over Indiana in the Peach Bowl. The Volunteers offense scored 293 points while the defense allowed 249 points.

Schedule

Game summaries

Ole Miss

Team players drafted into the NFL

Reference:

References

Tennessee
Tennessee Volunteers football seasons
Peach Bowl champion seasons
Tennessee Volunteers football